Lernaea is a genus of copepod crustaceans whose members are commonly called anchor worms and are parasitic on freshwater fishes.

Life cycle
Anchor worms mate during the last free-swimming (copepodid) stage of development. After mating, the female burrows into the flesh of a fish and transforms into an unsegmented, wormlike form, usually with a portion hanging from the fish's body.  Eggs are released from the posterior "tails" (egg sacs) into the water, where they hatch within 24 to 36 hours.  The nauplii will go through three stages before molting into copepodids, which associate with fish gills.  After a further five stages and mating, the male leaves the host and dies, while the female transitions into the anchored stage (may move to different fish host).

Diagnosis
Symptoms of anchor worm can be as follows:
 Anchor worms (Lernaea sp.) can be seen with the naked eye
 Frequent rubbing or "flashing"
 Localised redness
 Inflammation on the body of the fish
 Tiny white-green or red worms in wounds
 Breathing difficulties
 General lethargy

Treatment 
There are several treatments for anchor worm in the aquarium/pond. Potassium permanganate is usually considered the best treatment and can be used either as a tank treatment or a "dip". Other treatments include a salt dip, a formalin dip, and modern antiparasitics. Salt in the aquarium at 1 to 2 tablespoons may help prevent secondary infections.

Manual removal of the parasite is one of the surest ways to get rid of it; this can be done by holding the fish in the hand and removing the parasites with a pair of tweezers, being careful not to break the tail off leaving the head embedded and dipping the fish back into water every few seconds so it can breathe. Sometimes the parasite can burrow so deeply that pulling it out can cause more trauma than leaving it in and just treating it.

References 

Cyclopoida genera
Parasitic crustaceans
Animal parasites of fish